A flashing sign is a sign that contains a sequential flashing light source where the period of time of illumination is equal to the period of non-illumination, and is used solely to attract attention in a non-informative way.

The light can be intermittent or flashing, scintillating, blinking or traveling which give an illusion of flashing or intermittence or as an animation.

References

See also 
Neon sign
Flicker vertigo
Photosensitivity

Advertising tools